Jorge Marcelo Rodríguez Núñez (born January 13, 1985 in Montevideo) is a Uruguayan footballer who currently plays for Villa Teresa.

Club career
Rodríguez started his career in Uruguay where he played for Racing and Fénix.

In July 2010, he signed a new contract with the Mexican club Chiapas.

International career
Rodríguez received first cap at the friendly match against Japan on August 20, 2008.

On July 27, 2010 he was reserved to play a friendly match against Angola in Lisboa.

References

External links
 Profile at soccerway

1985 births
Living people
Uruguayan footballers
Uruguayan expatriate footballers
Uruguay international footballers
Racing Club de Montevideo players
Club Nacional de Football players
Centro Atlético Fénix players
Club Atlético River Plate (Montevideo) players
Peñarol players
Chiapas F.C. footballers
Club Atlético Tigre footballers
Club Deportivo Palestino footballers
C.A. Cerro players
C.A. Progreso players
Villa Teresa players
Uruguayan Primera División players
Liga MX players
Argentine Primera División players
Chilean Primera División players
Expatriate footballers in Mexico
Expatriate footballers in Argentina
Expatriate footballers in Chile

Association football midfielders